Joseph McLoughlin (12 August 1916 – 3 July 1991) was an Irish Fine Gael politician. A farmer before entering politics, he was first elected to Dáil Éireann as a Fine Gael Teachta Dála (TD) for the Sligo–Leitrim constituency at the 1961 by-election following the death of the Fianna Fáil TD Stephen Flynn. He was re-elected at each subsequent general election until he lost his seat at the 1977 general election.

His nephew Tony McLoughlin was a Fine Gael TD for Sligo–North Leitrim from 2011 to 2020.

See also
Families in the Oireachtas

References

1916 births
1991 deaths
Fine Gael TDs
Members of the 16th Dáil
Members of the 17th Dáil
Members of the 18th Dáil
Members of the 19th Dáil
Members of the 20th Dáil
Irish farmers